Gelechia griseaella is a moth of the family Gelechiidae. It is found in North America, where it has been recorded from Ontario.

The forewings are white, overlaid with brown, so as to give a greyish cast. In the costal and apical portions of the wing the brown scales are condensed into numerous irregular and indefinite spots and streaks.

References

Moths described in 1872
Gelechia